Logopolis is the seventh and final serial of the 18th season of the British science fiction television series Doctor Who, which was first broadcast in four weekly parts on BBC1 from 28 February to 21 March 1981. It was Tom Baker's last story as the Fourth Doctor and marks the first appearance of Peter Davison as the Fifth Doctor and Janet Fielding as new companion Tegan Jovanka.

The serial is set on the planets Earth and Logopolis. In the serial, the Doctor, a time traveller from the planet Gallifrey, forms a temporary truce with his arch-enemy the Master (Anthony Ainley) to stop the unravelling of the universe which the Master had started by accident.

The serial was the last Doctor Who story aired on Saturday nights for 2 years. When Peter Davison took over as the Fifth Doctor from January 1982, the BBC moved Doctor Who from Saturday nights to a new weekday prime time slot, airing two episodes per week.

Plot
Alerted to impending trouble by the TARDIS's Cloister Bell, the Fourth Doctor decides to stay out of trouble, and instead repair the TARDIS's broken chameleon circuit by materialising around a real police box on Earth and recording its exact dimensions with Adric's help. With those, he can give the mathematicians of the planet Logopolis the right block-transfer computations to repair the circuit. The Master learns of the Doctor's plan, and materialises his TARDIS around the police box first, causing a recursion loop with the Doctor's. The Doctor eventually breaks his TARDIS out of the loop, but when they step outside, he sees a figure in white, the Watcher, telling him to go to Logopolis immediately. En route, they find they have gained a passenger, Tegan Jovanka, an airline stewardess who entered the Police box seeking help for a broken-down car.

At Logopolis, everything seems normal as the Doctor provides the Monitor, the lead mathematician, his measurements to give to the others and perform their verbal calculations. They soon discover that the Master had arrived first, with several of the mathematicians killed by his tissue-compression eliminator. The Master's TARDIS materialises, and he and Nyssa, under his hypnotic control, seize the control center and use a device to silence the other mathematicians, demanding the Monitor to explain the purpose of a radio telescope on the planet. The Monitor begs for the Master to stop the silencing device. The Master does so, but to the Monitor's horror, the mathematicians remain silent, and they find the planet starting to turn to dust. The Monitor quickly explains that their calculations were used to power Charged Vacuum Emboitments (CVEs) which were used to funnel off excess entropy from this universe to prevent its approaching heat death; without the CVEs, entropy is taking over. The Monitor urges the Doctor to use their program to open a CVE, before he disintegrates. The Doctor and Master agree to work together and, after releasing Nyssa, bring Tegan with them to the Master's TARDIS and depart for Earth. Adric and Nyssa try to follow in the Doctor's TARDIS, but initially end up far outside the universe, and watch as entropy obliterates the sector of space with Nyssa's home planet, Traken. However, they fix the controls to track and follow the Master's TARDIS to Earth.

On Earth, the Doctor and Master use the radio telescope of the Pharos Project – from which the Logopolitans modelled theirs – to send the CVE program, while the Doctor's companions help to waylay the project's guards. However, the Master locks the Doctor out of the control room, and broadcasts a message across space, effectively blackmailing the rest of the universe to submit to him before he activates the program. The Doctor climbs out onto the telescope to stop the broadcast and reinitiate the CVE, ending the Master's threat; the Master quickly flees and escapes in his TARDIS. The Doctor falls off the telescope a great height, as Adric, Nyssa, and Tegan gather around him. The Doctor has visions of his past companions and enemies. His three companions see the Watcher appear, and the Doctor explains that "It's the end... but the moment has been prepared for." The Watcher touches and merges with the Doctor, causing him to regenerate into the Fifth Doctor.

Production

The location scenes at the Pharos Project were filmed at a BBC receiving station in Crowsley Park, with a model standing in for the radio telescope, and not the Lovell Telescope at the Jodrell Bank Observatory. The lay-by seen at the start was filmed on the southbound side of the A413 Amersham Road, Denham near Gerrards Cross. The lay-by is still there but the M25 now bridges the road where the scene was filmed.

Titles
The closing titles sequence was recompiled with Tom Baker's face removed from the closing credits of Episode 4, and with Peter Davison's face added for the following story, Castrovalva. Episode 4 of this story was the last time, for the next 24 years, the lead character was listed in the credits as "Doctor Who" (thus making it the only time Peter Davison was credited as "Doctor Who"). Beginning with the next story, Castrovalva, until the series's cancellation in 1989, the character was credited simply as "The Doctor". The 1996 television film did not have an on-screen credit for the Eighth Doctor, but listed the Seventh as the "Old Doctor". The 2005 relaunch returned the credit to "Doctor Who", and then again to "The Doctor" in "The Christmas Invasion" (at the request of David Tennant). Also, Episode 4 was the first to credit two actors as "Doctor Who" or "The Doctor" when a regeneration scene was involved. It also happened at the end of Episode 4 of The Caves of Androzani (1984). In both instances, Peter Davison was billed second.

Outside references
According to Christopher Bidmead, the Logopolitans employ a hexadecimal, or base-16, numerical system, a real system commonly used in computer programming. When Adric and the Monitor read strings of numbers and letters, the letters are actually the numbers between 10 and 15, expressed as single digits.

The police box around which the Doctor materialises the TARDIS in Part One was intended to be that located at the Barnet bypass, being at the time one of the last police boxes in the Metropolitan Police District still in its original location, though it had ceased functioning in the 1970s.

Broadcast and reception
Logopolis was repeated on BBC2 in November/December 1981, as part of "The Five Faces of Doctor Who". Stripped across four consecutive evenings from Monday to Thursday 9–12 November 1981, with viewing figures of 4.4, 4.6, 4.6 and 4.5 million respectively.

Paul Cornell, Martin Day, and Keith Topping wrote of the serial in The Discontinuity Guide (1995), deeming it "a magnificent farewell." Patrick Mulkern of Radio Times awarded the episode four stars out of five. Much praise was given to Baker's performance, writing, "He's brooding, sparky and never for a second looks ready to give up." In The Greatest Show in the Galaxy: The Discerning Fan's Guide to Doctor Who, Marc Schuster and Tom Powers deemed the episode "melancholy yet fascinating." In Doctor Who: The Episode Guide, Marc Campbell awarded the episode a 10 out of 10, praising it for "its weighty subject matter and the enormous scale of its threat." Conversely, Andrew Blair of Den of Geek felt the episode lacked pathos and regarded it as " a missed opportunity." Charlie Jane Anders called it "A moody, dark saga about computational engineering, that never quite gels as a story and has a nonsensical ending."

Commercial releases

In print

A novelisation of this serial, written by Christopher H. Bidmead, was published by Target Books in October 1982. An unabridged reading of the novelisation by Bidmead was released by BBC Audiobooks in February 2010, with a completely new cover.

Home media
The story was released on VHS in March 1992. In January 2007, the serial was released on DVD as part of a trilogy, entitled New Beginnings, alongside The Keeper of Traken and Castrovalva. Logopolis was also released as part of the Doctor Who DVD Files (issue 46) in October 2010. On 18 March 2019, Season 18 was re-released on Blu-ray, and given a new CGI option, including newly filmed shots filmed on location at Lovell Telescope.

Theatrical release
Fathom Events, in conjunction with the BBC, broadcast Logopolis to select cinemas in the United States on 13 March 2019, ahead of the planned Blu-ray release of Season 18 on 19 March 2019. The broadcast included additional interview footage with Baker, Fielding, and Sutton.

References

External links

Target novelisation

Fourth Doctor serials
The Master (Doctor Who) television stories
1981 British television episodes
Doctor Who serials novelised by Christopher H. Bidmead
Doctor Who stories set on Earth
Fifth Doctor serials
Fiction set in 1981
Doctor Who regeneration stories